The 2008 Campeonato Paulista de Futebol Profissional da Primeira Divisão - Série A1 was the 107th season of São Paulo's top-flight professional association football league. The competition began on January 16 and ended on May 4.
Palmeiras won their 22nd title with a 6–0 victory on aggregate in the finals over Ponte Preta.

First phase

League table

Results

Knockout phase

Bracket

Semi-finals

Finals

Top goalscorers

External links
Official webpage 
Championship on RSSSF Brazil

Campeonato Paulista seasons
Paulista